PunBB (PunBulletinBoard) is a lightweight PHP-based internet discussion board system released under the GNU General Public License. The project's primary goal is to be a faster, smaller and less graphic alternative to discussion boards such as phpBB, Invision Power Board or vBulletin. Many open-source and commercial projects' discussion boards use PunBB. Until September 2011, Facebook's Developers were using Facebook Developer's Forum for discussions and bug reports, which was powered by PunBB.

PunBB was originally designed to output standard XHTML, with speed and simplicity in mind. Features such as private messaging, polls, file sharing and attachments were not originally implemented. However, they have since been released as third-party modifications. PunBB supports extensions since version 1.3.

History
PunBB was founded by Rickard Andersson as a personal project to create an alternative to either over-featured or too graphic discussion boards. In August 2003, version 1.0 was released under the GNU General Public License. The developer released version 1.2 in January 2005 and immediately began work on version 1.3.

PunBB was originally known simply as Pun because "a pun is a play on words and that's basically what happens on a bulletin board". The BB addition stands for bulletin board. PunBB is available in many languages, including: Spanish, Russian, Italian, and many other languages. Languages are created by contributors of the project, languages are not officially made by PunBB. However, they are supported.

In 2007 the project's code and rights were sold to Informer Technologies, Inc. The company did not institute any major changes at first other than removing the ability to donate money to the project. The work on version 1.3 continued and in the beginning of 2008 the beta version was released. In April 2008, Rickard Andersson decided to leave the project due to personal reasons. As a result, some developers followed suit, and initiated the development of their own fork, known as FluxBB. A few days later the company moved the project from punbb.org domain to its projects' umbrella domain at punbb.informer.com.

The work on version 1.3 was resumed and minor changes, as well as, some bug fixes were introduced in updates. In March 2011 the company released version 1.3.5 and in September 2011 version 1.3.6 became available to public. The third quarter of 2011 gave birth to a significantly revised version of the engine, 1.4.0, which was the latest one at the time.

In February 2012, PunBB released version 1.4.2.

In June 2015, after 3 years of the last version released in 2012, PunBB has released the 1.4.3 version.

In October 2015 the 1.4.4 version has been released.

In January 2021 version 1.4.5 was released.

In March 2021 version 1.4.6 was released.

Requirements
PunBB is written in PHP and thus requires a PHP interpreter. PunBB also requires a database in which all forum data is stored. It supports MySQL, PostgreSQL and SQLite.

Forks

FluxBB

FluxBB is a fork of PunBB created by its developers after Andersson left the project in April 2008. The developers felt that forking was necessary to maintain control over the development process without the influence of commercial interests. As with PunBB, it was released under the GNU General Public License. In July 2008, FluxBB was announced as a finalist in SourceForge.net's 2008 Community Choice Awards in the "Best New Project" category.

Originally a continuation of PunBB's 1.3 branch, it was announced in January 2009 that the then-current 1.3 branch would be discontinued, and that FluxBB 1.4 would revert to being based on the 1.2 codebase. For FluxBB 1.4, several features were backported from 1.3, including UTF-8 support, a new default theme, and the ability to split and merge posts. The extension system, however, was not included. FluxBB 1.5 was released in May 2012.

In July 2012 it was announced that FluxBB 2.0, the next major version of the software, would be based on the Laravel web framework, with existing work ported to the new framework.

In 2015, FluxBB's lead developer Franz announced they would merge the project with another forum software named Flarum alongside esoTalk lead developer Toby Zerner. This caused a brief uproar in the FluxBB community.

See also
Comparison of Internet forum software

References

External links

 
 PunBB at GitHub
 FluxBB

Free Internet forum software
Free groupware
Free software programmed in PHP